Gabriella Patricia Taylor (born 7 March 1998) is an inactive British tennis player.

Taylor has won six singles and two doubles titles on the ITF Circuit. On 12 December 2018, she reached her best singles ranking of world No. 162. On 19 March 2018, she peaked at No. 479 in the WTA doubles rankings.

Personal life
Taylor was born on 7 March 1998 in Southampton, to a British father from Newcastle and a Bulgarian mother from Plovdiv. 
She started playing tennis at the age of four. She began to play in local tennis groups in Southampton’s David Lloyd until coaches saw her potential to take her on with individual lessons. She moved to Marbella, Spain at the age of 13 to further her tennis career and to Barcelona at 19. She turned pro at the age of 16.

In 2020, Taylor opened up about her struggles with her mental health issues such as anxiety and depression. As of 2022, she is taking an indefinite break from tennis, working as a freelance artist and pursuing a degree at the University of the Arts London.

Career

Juniors
At the 2012 'British Junior National Championships' Taylor became Under-14 girls' singles winner beating Katie Swan in the final 7–6(7), 6–3. Later in the year she was runner-up at the world's most prestigious junior tournament Junior Orange Bowl losing to Maia Lumsden 6–3, 7–5, both players having been semifinalists in that year's European equivalent the Petits As. The following year the two players teamed up to become Under-16 British National Junior Champions in the Doubles competition.

Taylor, Katie Swan, Freya Christie and  Maia Lumsden were members of the 2014 British team, coached by Judy Murray, that triumphed in the Maureen Connolly Challenge Trophy, an annual Under-18's competition against the USA.

2015
In November Taylor won her first ITF title in South Africa, unseeded she came from a set down to upset top seeded Naomi Totka of Hungary in three sets.

2016 – Wimbledon Juniors 'poisoning' incident and recovery
In 2016, Taylor achieved her best juniors results in her sole Junior Grand Slam appearance at Wimbledon. She reached the quarterfinals but had to retire in the following match against Kayla Day. Taylor contracted a bacterial infection called leptospirosis, which would keep her from playing tennis for a month. Initially, she was thought to have been poisoned while her bag was left unoccupied, however, medical experts declared this to be highly unlikely. Police later concluded that there was no evidence of deliberate poisoning.

Taylor recovered sufficiently to reach three consecutive ITF finals at Heraklion, Greece in October and November although failing to win any.

2017
In May, as the sixth seed, she won her first 25k tournament, beating third seed Danielle Lao in the final in straight sets. Wimbledon granted wild card entries to her in both the singles and the doubles (partnering Freya Christie) qualifying draws, losing both in the first round. In November she began working with coaches Xavier Budo and David Sunyer, which she credits with changing her mindset, leading to her most successful period to date.

2018
After three ITF title wins in February and March, Taylor broke into the top 200 rankings for the first time. She was subsequently chosen to represent Great Britain in the Fed Cup team alongside Johanna Konta, Heather Watson and Anna Smith for the World Group II play-off tie in Japan, however she did not play in any of the matches.

Taylor made her WTA Tour main-draw debut at the 2018 Nottingham Open. As a wild-card entry, she lost in the first round to the defending champion Donna Vekić, in three sets. In her first appearance in the main draw at Wimbledon, she lost to Eugenie Bouchard in three sets.

Performance timelines

Only main-draw results in WTA Tour, Grand Slam tournaments, Fed Cup/Billie Jean King Cup and Olympic Games are included in win–loss records.

Singles
Current after the 2021 Italian Open.

ITF Finals

Singles: 12 (6 titles, 6 runner–ups)

Doubles: 5 (3 titles, 2 runner–ups)

References

External links

 
 

1998 births
British female tennis players
Living people
Sportspeople from Southampton
English people of Bulgarian descent
English expatriate sportspeople in Spain
Tennis people from Hampshire